Arkansas is a rarities compilation by the Residents. All of the songs on the album were recorded during the Bunny Boy sessions.

Track listing

2009 albums